Liaoning Fangda Group Industrial Company Ltd is a Chinese industrial conglomerate focusing on carbon, chemicals, medical, steel products manufacturing, real estate development, mining, coking, and other services.

As of September 24, 2021, Liaoning Fangda Group Industrial Company Ltd took over control in HNA Group's Aviation division, including its flagship Hainan Airlines.

Companies owned by Liaoning Fangda
HNA Aviation - acquired from HNA Group in 2021
Fangda Carbon New Material Co. (formerly Lanzhou Hailong New Material Co.)
Northeastern Pharmaceutical Group (formerly Northeast Pharmaceutical General Factory (founded1946))
Fangda Special Steel Technology Co,
Northern Heavy Industry Group Co., Ltd. (NHI)

References

Companies of China
Business services companies established in 2000
Building materials companies of China